Glenea peregoi is a species of beetle in the family Cerambycidae. It was described by Stephan von Breuning in 1949.

Subspecies
 Glenea peregoi peregoi Breuning, 1949
 Glenea peregoi subinterrupt Breuning, 1956
 Glenea peregoi sumatrensis Breuning, 1976

References

peregoi
Beetles described in 1949